Kent Street Senior High School is a public co-educational specialist high day and boarding school in the Town of Victoria Park, located on Kent Street in East Victoria Park, a suburb of Perth, Western Australia.

Over 50 percent of students attending Kent Street live in neighbouring or other school districts. This is largely due to Kent Street's specialist programs (aeronautics, cricket, fashion & design, and Centre of Resources Excellence (CoRE)).

History 
The Western Australian Parliament received many proposals for a high school to situated south of the river through the 1920s but a lack of funds mostly due to the depression meant that the school did not eventuate. In 1932 a survey was conducted finding that 410 post primary age children were living in the South Perth and Victoria Park areas. Construction of the first building commenced in 1939 and the school commenced operations known as Kent Street Central School in 1940 with 354 students.

The buildings of the school are listed on the Western Australia Heritage Register and described as a complex of Inter-war Free Classical style brick and tile buildings and grounds.
School teams have entered Australian 5 Highs Cricket carnival, winning  at Brisbane 1994, and at Melbourne 2000 and 2005. The school hosted the carnival in 1996, 2001 and 2006.

Campus 
The School is based primarily on its  campus on Kent Street in East Victoria Park. The campus of the school is divided into three levels, because of its sloping hill it was positioned on. The school has no breaking in age groups except for a Canteen Quad for lower-school students and an Upper School Quad for upper school students.

Aviation course 
The school began to offer a course in aviation to Year 11 students in 1979. The first class was composed of 27 students. In 1988 the course was opened for lower school students to enrol in. Fundraising was required to purchase some of the equipment required and Joan Terry, wife of the late Paul Terry, donated an aircraft hangar in 1994. By 2000 the school had developed a partnership with Edith Cowan University to promote aviation education in Western Australia. The aviation course was one of the courses trialled in the Courses of Study roll-out in 2004 and became a TEE (now ATAR) equivalent course.

In 2008, the school joined a partnership with Skywest Airlines (now a subsidy of Virgin Australia), a Western Australian-based regional airline. With this partnership, aviation students can now undertake work experience and Structured Workplace Learning (SWL) at Skywest Airlines, assisting Licensed Aircraft Maintenance Engineers (LAME's) to undertake maintenance on Fokker 50 and Fokker 100 jet aircraft. In addition, upper school aviation students are able to undertake return flights with Virgin Australia pilots. Students work with the pilots to determine the weight and balance of the aircraft, decipher complex meteorological data and apply navigation principles relevant to these sophisticated jet aircraft.

Rotary Residential College 
The Rotary Residential College is on land leased from Kent Street Senior High School. The idea of the college was generated by the constant requests to metropolitan Rotary clubs for accommodation for high school students wanting to study special courses only provided at city based high schools. With the help of Federal, State and Local Governments, the corporate sector and guided by some Individual Rotary Clubs, this project is now a reality and has been operating since 1991.

Over the past 29 years some 450 boarders have availed themselves of the accommodation and they have come from nearly 100 country towns.

Notable alumni 

 Zoe Arancini - Olympic water polo player
 Gregory Corbitt - field hockey player
 Bradd Dalziell - Australian rules football player with the Brisbane Lions 2008 - 2009, West Coast Eagles 2010 – 2013
 Michael Dighton - cricket player with the Western Warriors, Tasmanian Devils Football Club
 Max Duffy -  Australian rules football player for the Fremantle Football Club 2013–2015; college American football player for the Kentucky Wildcats 2018–present
 Justin Eveson - Paralympic wheelchair basketball player
 Brian Glencross - hockey player and coach
 Glenys Godfrey - Member of the Western Australian Legislative Assembly for Belmont
 Milton Hook - Seventh-day Adventist historian
 Michael Jeffery   - Governor-General of Australia; Governor of Western Australia; Major General Australian Army
 Rebecca Judd - model, television presenter
 Iain MacLean - Member of the Western Australian Legislative Council for North Metropolitan, Member of the Western Australian Legislative Assembly for Wanneroo
 Rod Marsh   - Australian Test cricketer
 Chris Mayne -  Australian rules football player for the Fremantle Football Club 2008 – 2016, Collingwood Football Club 2017-2021
 Laine McDonald - Member of the Western Australian Legislative Council for North Metropolitan
 Tendai Mzungu -  Australian rules football player for the Fremantle Dockers 2011 – 2017
 Marcus North - cricket player with the Western Warriors
 Luke Pomersbach - cricket player with the Western Warriors
 Malcolm Poole - field hockey player
 Drew Porter - cricket player with the Western Warriors
 Luke Ronchi - cricket player with the Western Warriors
 Donald Smart - field hockey player
 Duncan Spencer -  cricket player with the Kent County Cricket Club and the Western Warriors
 Matthew Swinbourn - Member of the Western Australian Legislative Council for East Metropolitan Region, Parliamentary Secretary to the Attorney General; Minister for Electoral Affairs 
 David Taylor -  cricket player with the Derbyshire County Cricket Club and the Worcestershire County Cricket Club
Dr Alan Thomas - Australian Ambassador to Brazil, China, Belgium, Luxembourg, The European Union and NATO
 Ashley Thorpe -  cricket player with the Durham County Cricket Club
 Andrew Vlahov - NBL, Perth Wildcats, Australian Boomers, 4-time Olympian
 Christine Wheeler  - Justice of the Supreme Court of Western Australia
 Shane Woewodin - Australian rules football player for the Melbourne Football Club and Collingwood Football Club; Brownlow Medalist in 2000

See also 

 List of boarding schools in Australia
 List of schools in the Perth metropolitan area

References

Further reading 
 Ex-Principal, Rod Breseford
 History of Kent Street Senior High School, written by past staff in 1985.
 Student Records located in the School Science Block.

External links 
 Official school website
 Kentian Society
 School website on www.TeachWeb.com.au

Educational institutions established in 1949
Boarding schools in Western Australia
Public high schools in Perth, Western Australia
1949 establishments in Australia
East Victoria Park, Western Australia
State Register of Heritage Places in the Town of Victoria Park